Bow Falls is a major waterfall on the Bow River, Alberta just before the junction of it and the Spray River. They are located near the Banff Springs Hotel and golf course on the left-hand side of River Road.

The falls are within walking distance of both Banff and the Banff Springs Hotel, so they are visited by many tourists despite their relatively small size.

The 1953 Marilyn Monroe film River of No Return featured the falls.

References

External links
Bow Falls Hd Video.

Banff National Park
Banff, Alberta
Bow River
Waterfalls of Alberta
Block waterfalls